"Thirteen" is a song by the American rock band Big Star. Rolling Stone describes it "one of rock's most beautiful celebrations of adolescence", and rated it #396 on their list of the 500 greatest songs of all time.  It was written by Alex Chilton and Chris Bell. 

Bill Janovitz of Buffalo Tom writes in his AllMusic review of the song, "There are few songs that capture the aching innocence of adolescence as well" and calls it a "perfect melancholy ballad". The song encompasses folk and pop characteristics with its use of simple lyrics and the acoustic guitar.

The song was originally featured on the 1972 album #1 Record. It was released as a single by Big Star with “Watch the Sunrise” as the B-Side, on Ardent Records, but was mislabeled as “Don’t Lie to Me”.

"Thirteen" was featured in the season 6 and season 8 finale of That '70s Show. The song was covered by Grace VanderWaal and Graham Verchere in the 2020 movie Stargirl on Disney+ with a Grace Vanderwaal only performance appearing as a bonus on the soundtrack.

Covers
"Thirteen" has been covered by several notable musicians. They include:

When asked if there was a Big Star cover he was especially fond of, lead singer Alex Chilton mentioned Garbage's version of this song.

References

Songs about teenagers
1972 songs
American rock songs
Magnapop songs
Garbage (band) songs
Elliott Smith songs
Songs written by Alex Chilton
Rock ballads
Big Star songs